This is a list of National Hockey League (NHL) players who have played at least one game in the NHL from 1917 to present and have a last name that starts with "J".

List updated as of the 2018–19 NHL season.

Ja 

 Pat Jablonski
 Greg Jacina
 Barret Jackman
 Ric Jackman
 Tim Jackman
 Art Jackson
 Dane Jackson
 Don Jackson
 Doug Jackson
 Harold Jackson
 Harvey "Busher" Jackson
 Jack Jackson
 Jeff Jackson
 Jim Jackson
 Lloyd Jackson
 Percy Jackson
 Scott Jackson
 Stan Jackson
 Walter "Red" Jackson
 Josh Jacobs
 Paul Jacobs
 Tim Jacobs
 Jean-Francois Jacques
 Jason Jaffray
 Jaromir Jagr
 John Jakopin
 Pauli Jaks
 Risto Jalo
 Kari Jalonen
 Connor James
 Gerry James
 Val James
 James Jamieson
 Steve Janaszak
 Dan Jancevski
 Bob Janecyk
 Doug Janik
 Lou Jankowski
 Mark Jankowski
 Mattias Janmark-Nylen
 Craig Janney
 Cam Janssen
 Mark Janssens
 Marko Jantunen
 Ryan Jardine
 Calle Jarnkrok
 Christian Jaros
 Cole Jarrett
 Doug Jarrett
 Gary Jarrett
 Pierre Jarry
 Tristan Jarry
 Hannu Jarvenpaa
 Martti Jarventie
 Iiro Jarvi
 Doug Jarvis
 James "Bud" Jarvis
 Wes Jarvis
 Dmitrij Jaskin
 Jason Jaspers
 Arto Javanainen
 Bob Jay

Je–Ji 

 Tanner Jeannot
 Larry Jeffrey
 Tomas Jelinek
 Dean Jenkins
 Roger Jenkins
 Boone Jenner
 Bill Jennings
 Grant Jennings
 Al Jensen
 Chris Jensen
 Darren Jensen
 David Jensen (born 1961)
 David Jensen (born 1965)
 Joe Jensen
 Nick Jensen
 Nicklas Jensen
 Steve Jensen
 Jakub Jerabek
 Eddie Jeremiah
 Paul Jerrard
 Frank Jerwa
 Joe Jerwa
 Jeff Jillson
 Jaroslav Jirik

Jo 

 Rosario Joannette
 Rick Jodzio
 Jesse Joensuu
 Glenn Johannesen
 John Johannson
 Bill Johansen
 Ryan Johansen
 Trevor Johansen
 Andreas Johansson
 Bjorn Johansson
 Calle Johansson
 Jonas Johansson (born 1984)
 Jonas Johansson (born 1995)
 Magnus Johansson
 Mathias Johansson
 Roger Johansson
 Don Johns
 Stephen Johns
 Aaron Johnson
 Adam Johnson
 Al Johnson
 Bob Johnson
 Brent Johnson
 Brian Johnson
 Chad Johnson
 Craig Johnson
 Danny Johnson
 Earl Johnson
 Erik Johnson 
 Greg Johnson
 Ivan "Ching" Johnson
 Jim Johnson (born 1942)
 Jim Johnson (born 1962)
 Justin Johnson
 Luke Johnson
 Mark Johnson
 Matt Johnson
 Mike Johnson
 Norm Johnson
 Reese Johnson
 Ryan Johnson
 Terry Johnson
 Tom Johnson
 Tyler Johnson
 Virgil Johnson
 Andreas Johnsson
 Kim Johnsson
 Bernie Johnston
 Eddie Johnston
 George "Wingy" Johnston
 Greg Johnston
 Jay Johnston
 Joey Johnston
 Larry Johnston
 Marshall Johnston
 Randy Johnston
 Ross Johnston
 Ryan Johnston
 Ed Johnstone
 Ross Johnstone
 Mikko Jokela
 Henri Jokiharju
 Jussi Jokinen
 Olli Jokinen
 Jyrki Jokipakka
 Aurel Joliat
 Bobby Joliat
 Greg Joly
 Yvan Joly
 Jean-Francois Jomphe
 Stan Jonathan
 Alvin "Buck" Jones
 Bob Jones
 Brad Jones
 Caleb Jones
 Connor Jones
 Jim Jones
 Jimmy Jones
 Keith Jones
 Martin Jones
 Matt Jones
 Max Jones
 Randy Jones
 Ron Jones
 Ryan Jones
 Ty Jones
 Hans Jonsson
 Jorgen Jonsson
 Kenny Jonsson
 Lars Jonsson
 Tomas Jonsson
 Michal Jordan
 Jacob Josefson
 Chris Joseph
 Curtis Joseph
 Mathieu Joseph
 Pierre-Olivier Joseph
 Tony Joseph
 Dakota Joshua
 Roman Josi
 Derek Joslin
 Tyson Jost
 Andrew Joudrey
 Ed Jovanovski
 Eddie Joyal
 Bob Joyce
 Duane Joyce

Ju 

 Bing Juckes
 Patrik Juhlin
 Claude Julien
 Joe Juneau
 Steve Junker
 Joe Junkin
 Jonas Junland
 Olli Juolevi
 Milan Jurcina
 Timo Jutila
 Noah Juulsen
 Bill Juzda

See also
hockeydb.com NHL Player List - J

Players